Leonard (Captain) Gurle, sometimes spelled Garle or Garrle, established one of the earliest plant nurseries in post reformation Britain, selling both ornamental plants and fruit trees.    

In 1643 he leased a 12-acre site next to Brick Lane in Whitechapel. The list of plants that he sold may be found in The English Gardener by Leonard Meager (c. 1624–c. 1704).

In 1677 he succeeded John Rose(1619–77), as gardener to the Charles II at St James’s Palace.

References

Bibliography 

17th-century gardeners
English gardeners